El Menzah, is the name given to a group of suburbs located at the north of the agglomeration of Tunis, capital of Tunisia.

Description
Created for middle class and upper classes, it is a subdivision of residencies, villas and buildings. These subdivisions are numbered from I to X by date of creation, the number I, built in 1953 (now El Menzah I) and the following in the years 1990 and 2000.
Menzah II and III existed for a short time before that they were renamed Mutuelleville.

The subdivisions are administratively attached to the governorates of Tunis (délégation of El Menzah) and of Aryanah. El Menzah I, IV and IX are part of the municipality of Tunis, totalising  inhabitants, and El Menzah V to VII, are attached to the municipality of Aryanah, totaling  inhabitants.

Education
The Italian international school of Tunis, Istituto Scolastico Italiano "Giovan Battista Hodierna", is in El Menzah.

References

Geography of Tunisia
Tunis